George Beach (born July 26, 1817 Winchester, Litchfield County, Connecticut) was an American farmer, merchant and politician from New York.

Life
The family removed in 1825 to a farm in Greene County, New York. He attended the district schools, and engaged in farming. Later he became a merchant in Catskill.

He was Supervisor of the Town of Jewett from 1855 to 1858; and was Chairman of the Board of Supervisors of Greene County from 1856 to 1858. He was a delegate to the 1860 and 1864 Democratic National Conventions. In July 1863, he was appointed as colonel of the 86th Regiment of the National Guard.

He was a member of the New York State Senate (10th D.) in 1864 and 1865. In July 1867, he was appointed brigadier general of the 8th Brigade, 5th Division, of the National Guard.

He was again a member of the State Senate (14th D.) in 1868 and 1869. In January 1870, he was appointed as a State Assessor.

Sources
 The New York Civil List compiled by Franklin Benjamin Hough, Stephen C. Hutchins and Edgar Albert Werner (1870; pg. 420 and 443f)
 Life Sketches of the State Officers, Senators, and Members of the Assembly of the State of New York in 1868 by S. R. Harlow & S. C. Hutchins (pg. 61ff)
 Jewett Civil List transcribed at RootsWeb
 Green County Civil List transcribed at RootsWeb

1817 births
Year of death missing
Democratic Party New York (state) state senators
People from Winchester, Connecticut
People from Catskill, New York
Town supervisors in New York (state)